The 2011 French Indoor Athletics Championships was the 40th edition of the national championship in indoor track and field for France, organised by the French Athletics Federation. It was held on 19–20 February at the Jean-Pellez Stadium in Aubière. A total of 26 events (divided evenly between the sexes) were contested over the two-day competition.

Teddy Tamgho improved his own world indoor record with a jump to 17.91 m while 16-year-old Guy-Elphège Anouman set a world indoor best for a youth athlete with 21.13 seconds for the 200 metres.

Results

Men

Women

References

Results
 
 
Results. French Athletics Federation. Retrieved 2021-04-06.

External links
French Athletics Federation website

French Indoor Athletics Championships
French Indoor Athletics Championships
French Indoor Athletics Championships
French Indoor Athletics Championships
Sport in Puy-de-Dôme